Abrau-Dyurso or Abrau-Durso is a rural locality (a selo) under the administrative jurisdiction of the City of Novorossiysk in Krasnodar Krai, Russia. Population:

History

The settlement was founded on November 25, 1870 as a royal winery which was to provide wine for the Tsar's household. These plans were brought to fruition twenty-one years later, when Prince Lev Golitsyn, renowned for his Crimean vineyards of Massandra and Novy Svet, was appointed Surveyor of Imperial Vineyards at Abrau-Dyurso. It was he who brought to Russia a team of skilled winemakers from France. By 1897, Abrau-Dyurso boasted champagne cellars containing in excess of 13,000 bottles.

The Russian Revolution of 1917 brought an end to Abrau-Dyurso's prosperity, if only for a short time. The French specialists fled Russia, but their work was continued by their Russian apprentices. Throughout the Soviet period, Abrau-Dyurso was reputed for its sparkling wine, which was marketed under the name of Sovetskoye Shampanskoye ("Soviet Champagne").

Economy
Abrau-Dyurso is the center of Russia's most important wine-growing region.

In August 2002, the local earth dam located upstream of the Dyurso River collapsed, washing away some of the grape fields in the Dyurso Valley and killing 2 people.

As of 2005, the local winery, Abrau-Durso, produced 5,800,000 bottles of sparkling wine. There is a museum of sparkling wines on its grounds.

References

External links
Official website of the Abrau-Dyurso wineries
Photos from Abrau-Durso

Rural localities in Krasnodar Krai
Populated places established in 1870
Wine regions of Russia
1870 establishments in the Russian Empire